"Beautiful Life" is a Lydia Canaan song. It was released in July 1995 as the first single from her debut studio album, The Sound of Love.

The song was presented to radio and media at the Midem in Cannes, France in February 1995. That Spring Canaan's international release of "Beautiful Life"' by London-based Pulse-8 Records gained her international critical acclaim, eliciting comparisons to Celine Dion, Cher, and Tina Turner (Billboard, Music Week,), radio promo tour in the UK, radio airplay in the UK, Europe, South Africa, and the Middle East. In 1998 it was exhibited on Billboard magazine's TalentNet and topped the charts for months at No. 1., endorsed by iconic radio personality Casey Kasem.

MTV Europe
Canaan performed "Beautiful Life" at the launch of MTV Europe held in Beirut, with the participation of Pato Banton, Urban Cookie Collective, and Rozalla on May 12, 1995. President of MTV Europe Peter Einstein stated during a press conference: "MTV is proud and privileged to play Lydia's videos on Music-Non-Stop Show... All at MTV have fallen in love with Lydia, her songs, and her performance".

Humanitarian anthem
South African President Nelson Mandela chose "Beautiful Life"' as the theme song for a charity event in South Africa under his auspices.

Music video
Lydia Canaan filmed the music video for her song "Beautiful Life" at Canalot Studios and Syon House, the castle of the Duke of Northumberland, in London, England.

See also
 Lydia Canaan

References

External links
 "Beautiful Life"
 "Beautiful Life" Video

1995 singles
1995 songs
Lydia Canaan songs
Pulse 8 singles
Songs written by Barry Blue
Songs written by Marco Sabiu